Man'a Soud Al-Barshi  is a Qatari football forwarder who played for Qatar in the 1984 AFC Asian Cup.

Al-Barshi appeared once for Qatar in the 1984 AFC Asian Cup group stage matches.

References

External links
Stats

Living people
Qatar international footballers
Qatari footballers
1984 AFC Asian Cup players
Association football forwards
Qatar Stars League players
Year of birth missing (living people)